Lukasz Jogalla (also known as Lucas Jogalla or Luckasz Jogalla; born 17 January 1961) is an American cinematographer who has worked on many feature films.

He was born in Kraków, Poland and moved to the United States with his future wife in 1984. He has been married to Magdalena Deskur since 1988, and they have two children.

He is the son of Elżbieta Maria Stefania (Turowicz) and actor Jerzy Jogałła. His maternal grandfather was journalist and editor Jerzy Turowicz, and his son is actor Pico Alexander.

Filmography

References

External links

1961 births
Living people
Film people from Kraków
American cinematographers
Polish emigrants to the United States
Artists from New York City